Hélder Pinheiro (born 25 November 1969) is a Portuguese gymnast. He competed in seven events at the 1988 Summer Olympics.

References

1969 births
Living people
Portuguese male artistic gymnasts
Olympic gymnasts of Portugal
Gymnasts at the 1988 Summer Olympics
Place of birth missing (living people)
20th-century Portuguese people